WTYB (103.9 FM) is a radio station licensed to serve Bluffton, South Carolina, United States.  The station is owned by Cumulus Broadcasting.

It broadcasts an Urban AC music format targeted to Savannah, Georgia.

Station history
Originally launched as WGEC, licensed to Springfield, Georgia, in March 1978, this station first aired an urban adult contemporary music format from 1998-2003 as WSIS "Kiss 104" and then as "V103.9".  Briefly in 2005, the station aired an Oldies format as "Cool 103.9."

The station was assigned the WTYB call letters by the Federal Communications Commission on July 9, 2004. After stunting with Christmas music and the greatest hits of Johnny Cash, the station debuted as "Magic 103.9" with an Urban AC format on January 8, 2006.

In November 2007, Cumulus attempted to transfer ownership of WTYB to a trustee, Stratus Radio LLC, with the intention of selling it to another owner in order to meet FCC ownership caps. That deal, however, ultimately fell through and Cumulus Licensing LLC retained the broadcast license.

In April 2011, after the Cumulus merger with Citadel Broadcasting, it was determined that WTYB would be one of several stations spun off to Volt Radio, LLC. The station was reclaimed from the trust effective April 28, 2016.

References

External links

TYB
Urban adult contemporary radio stations in the United States
Radio stations established in 1978
1978 establishments in Georgia (U.S. state)
Cumulus Media radio stations